
Guayaques Lake is a lake in the Eduardo Avaroa Andean Fauna National Reserve of the Potosí Department, Bolivia. Its surface area is 1.43 km².

References 

Lakes of Potosí Department